Sulfurospirillum barnesii is a bacterium.

References

Further reading
Afkar, E., 2012. Localization of the dissimilatory arsenate reductase in Sulfurospirillum Barnesi strain SeS-3. Am. J. Agric. Biol. Sci., 7: 97–105.
Whitman, William B., et al., eds. Bergey's manual® of systematic bacteriology. Vol. 5. Springer, 2012.

External links 

LPSN
Type strain of Sulfurospirillum barnesii at BacDive -  the Bacterial Diversity Metadatabase

Campylobacterota